Nathan Peavy De Jesús (born March 31, 1985) is a former Puerto Rican-American professional basketball player who serves as an assistant coach for the Capitanes de Ciudad de México of the NBA G League. He previously served as the head coach of the Salt Lake City Stars of the NBA G League from 2020 to 2022. Between the 2017 and 2020 seasons, he served as assistant coach for the team under head coach Martin Schiller. 

As a player, Peavy worked with teams in North America and Europe, besides playing as a native in the Baloncesto Superior Nacional (BSN). In international competition, he represented Puerto Rico. A series of injuries resulted in prolonged periods of inactivity which ultimately led to his retirement.

Early life
Peavy was born in Dayton, Ohio, on March 31, 1985 to Terry Peavy, a former professional basketball player drafted by the Cleveland Cavaliers in 1979, and Nila Lisa De Jesús, a former member of the Puerto Rico women’s national swimming team.

Professional career
From 2003–2007, Peavy played for the Miami (OH) Redhawk basketball team, where he averaged 11.2 points, 6.9 rebounds and .519 FG% in his final year.

In 2007, Peavy turned professional by joining the Paderborn Baskets of the German Basketball League, where he played until 2009. In 2009, Peavy signed with the Artland Dragons of the same league.

Before the beginning of the 2012–13 season, he suffered a cruciate ligament rupture during a friendly game. As a result of this injury, he did not play for ALBA Berlin this season anymore.

Career statistics

Domestic leagues

See also
List of Puerto Ricans

References
 Miami RedHawks bio

1985 births
Living people
2010 FIBA World Championship players
Alba Berlin players
American expatriate basketball people in Germany
American expatriate basketball people in Mexico
American men's basketball coaches
American men's basketball players
Artland Dragons players
Baloncesto Superior Nacional players
Basketball coaches from Ohio
Basketball players from Dayton, Ohio
Capitanes de Ciudad de México coaches
Central American and Caribbean Games gold medalists for Puerto Rico
Central American and Caribbean Games medalists in basketball
Competitors at the 2010 Central American and Caribbean Games
Miami RedHawks men's basketball players
Piratas de Quebradillas players
Power forwards (basketball)
Puerto Rican men's basketball players
Puerto Rico men's national basketball team players
Salt Lake City Stars coaches